Ifelodun is a Local Government Area in Osun State, Nigeria. Its headquarters are in the town of Ikirun.

Ifelodun has an area of 114 km and a population of 96,748 at the 2006 census.

The LGA headquarters in Ikirun are about 10 minutes drive north of Osogbo, the state capital. 
There are twelve wards, mostly agrarian. Crops include kolanut, palm oil, root crops and fruit.
Towns include Ikirun, Iba, Eko-Ende, Eko-Ajala, Obaagun, Dagbolu, Seke, Fidibomi and Oluode. 
Neighboring local governments are Olorunda, Odo Otin and Boripe.
The postal code of the area is 231.

References

Local Government Areas in Osun State
Local Government Areas in Yorubaland